Gul-o-Gulzar is a 2019 Pakistani television series created by Humayun Saeed and Shahzad Nasib under their production house Six Sigma Plus. It focuses on the life of two best friends turned enemies; Gul and Gulzar played by Saboor Aly and Kinza Hashmi respectively. The serial airs every Thursday evenings on ARY Digital.

It was broadcast by MBC Bollywood in Arab countries under the title جل و جلزار. This series is available on Indian OTT Platform MX Player.

Plot 
Gulzar is a studious and innocent girl in college who wants to pass her exams, and make her brother proud as well as her whole family. Gul on the other hand is a cunning backstabbing girl who wants money; and unfortunately will do anything it takes to achieve her greedy goals.

Cast 
 Saboor Aly as Gul Chaudhary 
 Kinza Hashmi as Gulzar Iqbal
 Omer Shahzad as Adil; Gul's love interest
 Mariam Mirza as Adil’s mother
 Paras Masroor as Jamal; Gulzar's husband
 Firdous Jamal as Master Iqbal; Afaq and Gulzar's father
 Kanwar Nafees as Afaq; Gulzar's brother
 Nayyar Ejaz as Kifayat Chaudhary; Gul's father
 Shaista Jabeen as Kaneez Chaudhary; Gul's mother
 Arjumand Azhar as Adil's father
 Fahima Awan as Zeba; Afaq's wife
 Aliya Ali as Mahjabeen; Adil's second wife

Nominations

References

Pakistani drama television series
2019 Pakistani television series debuts
Urdu-language television shows
ARY Digital original programming